"Dahil Sa Iyo"  is a song by Mike Velarde, Jr., written in 1938 for the movie, Bituing Marikit and sung by Rogelio de la Rosa. A version with English-Tagalog lyrics, recorded in 1964, was a hit in the United States and continues to be popular in Filipino communities on American soil.

One of the most popular examples of the kundiman genre, this "classic Filipino love song" with original Tagalog lyrics has been translated into different languages. The languages it was translated in include English, Spanish, Japanese, Chinese, and other local languages of the Philippines.

Representing an earlier era remembered in nostalgia, it is one of the most popular songs in Tagalog, and a favorite in the Philippines as well as among Filipino communities in Honolulu, on the American West Coast, and in places like Virginia Beach, Virginia. Its popularity in the Philippines is such that some think it ought to replace the current national anthem, and that it be played if former American president Barack Obama had made a state visit to the Philippines. It has been covered many times and is a standard on the repertoire of many artists performing Filipino romantic and popular music. The song's canonical status as a classic Filipino love song was again confirmed by its inclusion on the 2004 hit compilation album Great Filipino Love Songs.

The song is a personal favourite of former First Lady Imelda Marcos, wife of President Ferdinand Marcos. She would sing it frequently: as a duet with her husband in public gatherings, during her 1992 presidential bid, and performed it as late as July 2000 to wounded soldiers in the Armed Forces of the Philippines Medical Center in Quezon City. In 2008, the song was still associated with her in Manila: "Suddenly, the heads of Peninsula Hotel lobby guests swiveled. Imelda Marcos had walked in. Without missing a beat, hotel musicians struck up 'Dahil sa Iyo.'"

The song is known in the United States because of the Filipino-English lyrics by Tom Spinosa (original lyrics by Dominador Santiago) and Mike Velarde Jr. It was recorded by Cora and Santos Beloy, and released in 1964 by Tri-World Records. This rendition of the song has a 1964 copyright owned by Dexter Music Co. The original composer, Mike Velarde, Jr., said: "Sometime in 1960 a famous US singer who made a personal appearance in Manila presented me a contract seeking authority to record 'Dahil Sa Iyo' in the States. The five figure offer was fabulous but I turned it down - simply because she wanted to change the title to an American title. I couldn't, and wouldn't sell the identity we are trying hard to establish. The merits of the song is its identity.'"

This song was famously performed by Nat King Cole at the Araneta Coliseum (now SMART Araneta Coliseum) in Quezon City in 1961.

This was also sung by Jerry Vale with English title "Your Love Is Mine" (Eng. lyrics by Sonny Burke) on his album The Language of Love on Columbia Records, released in 1963.

The late Malaysian pop singer Surdiman Arshad also sang his few lines sample version during the closing ceremonies in the 15th South East Asian Games 1989 in Kuala Lumpur, Malaysia, and also 1 year before Manila Philippines hosted the SEA Games in 1991.

References

External links
 sung by the Mabuhay Singers.
 words and music by Tom Spinosa and Mike Velarde Jr.
 sung by PINAY at Xubee Studios.

1938 songs
1964 songs
Tagalog-language songs